Kin is the third studio album by British thrash metal band Xentrix. It was released on March 27, 1992, and was their second album released through Roadrunner Records. The album goes more into a progressive approach than their two previous albums and was considered by the band to be the biggest mistake during their career. With a peak at No. 74 on the UK charts, the album was the last charting album for the band and the last album with vocalist/guitarist Chris Astley until his return in 2006.

Track listing

Personnel
Xentrix
Chris Astley - Vocals, Rhythm Guitar
Dennis Gasser - Drums
Paul "Macka" MacKenzie - Bass
Kristian "Stan" Havard - Lead Guitar

Additional musicians
Carl Arnfield - Keyboards

Production
Brian Burrows - Sleeve Design, Typography 
Doug Bennett - Assistant engineer
Nick Atkins  - Mixing (assistant)  
Mark Flannery  - Producer, Engineering, Mixing
Dave Higginson -  Cover Art
Vincent McDonald -  Band Photos

References
 
 

1992 albums
Xentrix albums
Roadrunner Records albums